Tom Harris may refer to:

Tom Harris (announcer) (born 1962), American announcer and sportscaster
Tom Harris (Australian politician) (born 1940), Northern Territory MLA
Tom Harris (botanist) (1903–1983), palaeobotanist and academic at the University of Reading in the UK
Tom Harris (British politician) (born 1964), Scottish former MP
Tom Harris (film producer), producer of The Cross and the Switchblade
Tom Harris (footballer) (1905–1985), English footballer
Tom Harris (football manager), manager of Notts County F.C. between 1893 and 1913
Tom Harris (mechanical engineer) (born 1953), Canadian lobbyist
Tom Harris, bass player for Detroit rock band Frijid Pink
An alias of Whitey Bulger (1929–2018)

See also
 Thomas Harris (disambiguation)
 Tommy Harris (disambiguation)